BMW M Motorsport (formerly BMW Motorsport) is the division of BMW responsible for motorsport-related activities, including works-run competition programmes in touring car racing, sports car racing, motorcycle racing and Formula E.

The current organisation is a result of a restructure in April 2021, bringing together the BMW M high-performance division with the competitive motorsport division.

Key personnel include Franciscus van Meel, CEO of BMW M GmbH, and Andreas Roos, Head of BMW M Motorsport.

Teams

LMDh (Endurance sportscar)
 BMW M Team RLL
 Team WRT

GT racing (sportscar)

GT3
 Bimmerworld Racing
 BMW Junior Team
 BMW M Team RLL
 BMW Team Studie
 Ceccato Motors
 Century Motorsport
 JR Motorsport
 Paul Miller Racing
 ROWE Racing
 Schubert Motorsport
 ST Racing
 Turner Motorsport
 Walkenhorst Motorsport
 Team WRT

GT4
 Auto Technic Racing
 Bimmerworld Racing
 Borusan Otomotiv Motorsport
 Century Motorsport
 Giti Tire Motorsport By WS Racing
 Fast Track Racing
 FK Performance Motorsport
 Hofor Racing by Bonk Motorsport
 Inspire Racing
 JJ Motorspor
 Project 1
 Random Vandals Racing
 Rooster Hall Racing
 Schubert Motorsport
 Stephen Cameron Racing
 Team Avia Sorg Rennsport
 Turner Motorsport
 Walkenhorst Motorsport
 W&D Racing Team

DTM 

 Team RMG - also responsible for M's test and development efforts in GT.

See Deutsche Tourenwagen Masters for BMW's historical involvement in DTM.

From 2021 onwards the DTM series ran GT3 cars

For 2023, announcements are on hold pending reorganisation of the DTM series under new ownership.

Racecars

Current

 BMW M235i Racing
 BMW M240i Racing
 BMW M2 CS Racing
BMW M4 GT3
BMW M4 GT4
BMW M4 GT4 Concept
BMW M Hybrid V8

Factory drivers

2023 factory drivers
Alphabetical order. Full season details TBC. Herta has been confirmed as the third driver at the Rolex 24. Spengler will also serve as BMW SIM Racing Ambassador and BMW Group Classic Ambassador.

Notable former factory drivers 
 Nicky Catsburg
 Stef Dusseldorp
 Alexander Sims
Sebastian Vettel
 Jenson Button

See also
 BMW M
 BMW in motorsport
 BMW Sauber
 Alpina
 Dinan BMW
 BMW Motorrad

References

External links
 BMW Motorsport Official website

 
German auto racing teams
European Le Mans Series teams
German racecar constructors

FIA World Endurance Championship teams
American Le Mans Series teams
British Touring Car Championship teams
24 Hours of Le Mans teams